Negarestan may refer to:
 Negarestan, East Azerbaijan
 Negarestan, Fars
 Negarestan Research Station, Fars Province
 Negarestan, Kurdistan